The Cucuveanu is a left tributary of the river Argova in Romania. It flows into the Argova near Zimbru.

References

Rivers of Romania
Rivers of Călărași County